The 2016 Can-Am 500 was a NASCAR Sprint Cup Series race held on November 13, 2016, at Phoenix International Raceway in Avondale, Arizona. Contested over 324 laps - extended from 312 laps due to an overtime finish, on the one mile (1.6 km) oval, it was the 35th race of the 2016 NASCAR Sprint Cup Series season, ninth race of the Chase and final race of the Round of 8.

Report

Background

Phoenix International Raceway – also known as PIR – is a one-mile, low-banked tri-oval race track located in Avondale, Arizona. It is named after the nearby metropolitan area of Phoenix. The motorsport track opened in 1964 and currently hosts two NASCAR race weekends annually. PIR has also hosted the IndyCar Series, CART, USAC and the Rolex Sports Car Series. The raceway is currently owned and operated by International Speedway Corporation.

The raceway was originally constructed with a  road course that ran both inside and outside of the main tri-oval. In 1991 the track was reconfigured with the current  interior layout. PIR has an estimated grandstand seating capacity of around 67,000. Lights were installed around the track in 2004 following the addition of a second annual NASCAR race weekend.

Phoenix International Raceway is home to two annual NASCAR race weekends, one of 13 facilities on the NASCAR schedule to host more than one race weekend a year. The track is both the first and last stop in the western United States, as well as the fourth and penultimate track on the schedule.

Entry list

First practice
Martin Truex Jr. went to a backup car after wrecking his primary in the closing second of the session.

Qualifying

He said afterwards that earning it was "amazing. We weren’t really that strong in qualifying trim in practice. I don’t really know where that came from, but I just can’t thank everybody at Hendrick Motorsports enough. To do this in Phoenix, so close to home, means so much to me. We have had such fast racecars we haven’t had an ounce of luck, but to get a pole here means a lot.”

Qualifying results

Practice (post-qualifying)

Second practice

Final practice

Race

First half
Alex Bowman led the field to the green flag at 2:48 p.m. Kyle Larson brought out the first caution of the race on the first lap after he got loose and spun out in turn 4.

The race restarted on lap 6. During the run, pre-race favorite Kevin Harvick slid back through the field reporting that his car started loose, then started "plowing through the center." Martin Truex Jr., who started 40th, broke into the top-10 on lap 63. A number of cars started pitting under green on lap 79. Trying to get on pit road, Ryan Newman locked up his brakes, spun out and slammed into the rear-end of Larson's car, bringing out the second caution on lap 82. Truex, who was leading the race when the caution flew, was held a lap on pit road for "pulling up to pit." This gave the lead back to Bowman.

The race restarted on lap 91. Joey Logano drove to the outside of Bowman going into turn 1 to take the lead on lap 93. Bowman tried to dive to the inside of Logano going into turn 3 on lap 118, but it cost him second to teammate Jimmie Johnson, who proceeded to pass Logano on the backstretch to take the lead on lap 120. Debris on the fronstretch brought out the third caution on lap 132. Logano exited pit road first. Johnson was held a lap on pit road for "pulling up to pit." Following the race, Johnson said that "guys have been pulling up like that all weekend to go to pit lane. In 15 years that has never been a concern, and I was always told that the last thing NASCAR wanted to do would be to penalize the leader, and as you pull off onto the apron, you accelerate to the commitment line. If you are held by the pace car, you’re at a disadvantage as the leader and it allows everybody to catch you and catch up, so even in drivers’ meetings they’ve said, we know you’re going to pass the pace car; it’s okay. The majority of the tracks we go to, you naturally just gradually pull ahead of the pace car coming to pit lane. I mean, this happens all the time. I am still baffled, and I don’t know if I will stop being baffled, but all I can say is if they called me on it and they continue to call everybody else on it every week, then shame on me.’’

Second half
The race restarted on lap 140. Bowman pulled up to and passed Logano on the backstretch to retake the lead on lap 158. Debris in turn 1 brought out the fourth caution on lap 210.

The race restarted on lap 218 and Bowman only made it to turn 2 before caution flew for the fifth time when Austin Dillon backed into Greg Biffle and Johnson, and got turned sideways in turn 1.

The race restarted with 84 laps to go. The sixth caution flew with 56 to go for a two-car wreck involving Truex and Newman. Truex went on to finish 40th. Denny Hamlin opted not to pit and assumed the lead. Biffle was sent to the tail end of the field on the restart for speeding on pit road.

The race restarted with 51 to go. Matt Kenseth overtook Hamlin with ease and assumed the lead with 50 to go. Debris in turn 3 brought out the seventh caution with 46 to go.

The race restarted with 43 to go. Bowman demonstrated his car was the fastest in the run to the finish as he worked his way through the top-five to take second with under 20 to go. But the gap from second to Kenseth in the lead was almost four seconds and not closing fast enough. The dynamic of the race changed when Michael McDowell suffered a tire blowout, slammed the wall in turn 3 and brought out the eighth caution with two laps remaining, forcing overtime.

Overtime

First attempt

On the first overtime attempt with two laps to go, Kyle Busch tried for the inside of Bowman going into the first turn, but Bowman went down to block him and got sideways. This put him at an awkward angle going into the turn and resulted in him inadvertently "punting" Kenseth out of the groove and into the wall, bringing out the ninth caution. “Is there anything I can do or say right now to make it better?” Kenseth asked after the race. “The only thing I can do or say right now is make things worse, so really I’m just trying not to do that.” He added that feeling disappointment "would put it lightly. It finished our season. Five minutes before that, it looked like we were going to have a chance to go race for a championship." Busch took the blame for what happened afterwards saying "I guess I wrecked a teammate. I feel horrible about it ... Right now, it feels really (expletive), but tomorrow it might feel a lot better. ... The 20 should have been the Gibbs car to (advance)." Logano after the race said he "saw Kyle getting a run on him and I was like, 'Oh, boy! I knew Kyle was going to go three wide, and he has to. He's racing for a championship. That's the desperation that sets in." He was also scored as the race leader.

Second attempt
On the second attempt with two to go, the field made it past the overtime line on the backstretch, making it an official attempt, and Logano drove on to score the victory.

Post-race

Driver comments
Logano said in victory lane that his win "feels so good. I've never felt this good about a win before. There was so much on the line and everyone brings their A-game when it comes to winning championships and this team did it. Man, this feels so good. I had a good restart there at the end and holding off Kyle to try to get this thing into Miami. We're racing for a championship now. We did exactly what we had to do. We've got to go to Homestead and do the same thing.”

Harvick, who failed to make the Championship 4 for the first time with a fourth-place finish, said he "just started way too far off on Friday. We never got a handle on the racecar. They made it a ton better in the race and we were in contention there at the end and just came up short. Just really proud of everybody for the effort that they put in. It was a very challenging Chase for us for all the mechanical failures and situations that we had going on. We kept rebounding and winning races and today we were a lap down and came back to have a chance at the end. That says a lot about the character of our race team and we just came up short this year.”

Bowman, who led a race high of 194 laps and earned a career-best sixth-place finish, said on the "last couple of restarts, I just didn't do a very good job. We should have been leading that last restart to begin with. That part of it is unfortunate, what happened with (Kenseth). I hate taking somebody out of the Chase like that. It ruined our day, too. There's s no way we should have finished sixth. That's the worst we were all day. It's just frustrating.’’

Race results

Race summary
 Lead changes: 5 among different drivers
 Cautions/Laps: 9 for 53
 Red flags: 0
 Time of race: 3 hours, 8 minutes and 59 seconds
 Average speed:

Media

Television
NBC covered the race on the television side. Rick Allen, two–time Phoenix winner Jeff Burton and Steve Letarte had the call in the booth for the race. Dave Burns, Mike Massaro, Marty Snider and Kelli Stavast handled pit road on the television side.

Radio
MRN had the radio call for the race, which was simulcast on Sirius XM NASCAR Radio.

Standings after the race

Drivers' Championship standings

Manufacturers' Championship standings

Note: Only the first 16 positions are included for the driver standings.

References

2016 in sports in Arizona
2016 NASCAR Sprint Cup Series
NASCAR races at Phoenix Raceway
Can-Am 500
November 2016 events in the United States